Gorrini is an Italian surname. Notable people with the surname include:

 Giacomo Gorrini (1859–1950), Italian diplomat and historian
 Luigi Gorrini (1917–2014), Italian World War II fighter pilot

See also
 Gori (disambiguation)

Italian-language surnames
it:Gorrini